Antoine Faivre (5 June 1934 – 19 December 2021) was a French scholar of Western esotericism. Until his retirement, he held a chair in the École Pratique des Hautes Études at the Sorbonne, University Professor of Germanic studies at the University of Haute-Normandie, director of the Cahiers del Hermétisme and of Bibliothèque de l'hermétisme, and was with Wouter Hanegraaff and Roland Edighoffer, the editor of the journal Aries.

Thought 
Antoine Faivre affirmed occultism, gnosticism and hermeticism share a set of common characteristics that include the faith in the existence of secret and syncretistic concordances -both symbolic and real- between the "macrocosm and the microcosm, the seen and the unseen, and indeed all that is". Those doctrines believe in alchemic transmutation and on an initiatric transmission of knowledge from a master to his pupil.

Personal life and death 
Faivre died on 19 December 2021 at the age of 87.

Bibliography 

 Les vampires: Essai historique, critique et littéraire, Paris, Le Terrain vague, 1962
 Kirchberger et l’Illuminisme du XVIIIe siècle, The Hague, Nijhoff, 1966
 Eckartshausen et la théosophie chrétienne, Paris, Klincksieck, 1969 (reprinted with a preface by Jean-Marc Vivenza, Hyères, La Pierre Philosophale, 2016)
 L’ésotérisme au XVIIIe siècle en France et en Allemagne, La Table d’Émeraude, Seghers, 1973
 Mystiques, théosophes et illuminés au siècle des lumières, Hildesheim, Olms, 1976
 Toison d'or et alchimie, Milan, Archè, 1990. English transl. Golden Fleece and Alchemy, Albany, State University of New York Press, 1993, reprint 1995
 Philosophie de la nature (physique sacrée et théosophie, XVIIIe-XIXe siècles), Paris, Albin Michel, 1996 (Prix de philosophie Louis Liard, de l'Académie des Sciences morales et politiques).
 The Eternal Hermes (From Greek God to Alchemical Magus), Grand Rapids, Phanes Press, 1996
 Accès de l'ésotérisme occidental, Paris, Gallimard ("Bibliothèque des sciences humaines"), vol. I, 1986, 2nd ed., 1996,  vol. II, 1996. English transl. vol. I : Access to Western Esotericism, Albany, State University of New York Press, 1994, vol. II: Theosophy, Imagination, Tradition, Studies in Western Esotericism, Albany, State University of New York Press, 2000
 L'ésotérisme, Paris, PUF, 1992, 3e éd., 2003
 De Londres à Saint-Pétersbourg: Carl Friedrich Tieman (1743-1802) aux carrefours des courants illuministes et maçonniques, Milan, Archè, 2018

References

External links 
Official website

1934 births
2021 deaths
20th-century French historians
Academic staff of the École pratique des hautes études
Writers from Reims
University of Paris alumni
Western esotericism scholars